HC Vítkovice Ridera is an ice hockey club based in Vítkovice, the Moravian-part of Ostrava, in the Czech Republic, competing in the Czech Extraliga. It plays at Ostravar Aréna (formerly Palác kultury a sportu Ostrava-Vítkovice).

The club was founded in 1928 after the merger of SK Moravská Slavia and SK Slovan Ostrava. Vítkovice were the champions of the Czechoslovak First Ice Hockey League in the 1951–52 and 1980–81 seasons.

Honours

Domestic
Czech Extraliga
  Runners-up (4): 1996–97, 2001–02, 2009–10, 2010–11
  3rd place (2): 1997–98, 2000–01

Czechoslovak Extraliga
  Winners (2): 1951–52, 1980–81
  Runners-up (5): 1949–50, 1950–51, 1952–53, 1982–83, 1992–93
  3rd place (2): 1957–58, 1978–79

International
IIHF European Cup
  Runners-up (1): 1981–82

Pre-season
Spengler Cup
  Runners-up (1): 1980

Tatra Cup
  Winners (5): 1968/1969, 2002, 2006, 2007, 2009

Players

Current roster

Franchise history
1928–1936: SSK (Sportovně Společenský Klub)
1936–1945: ČSK (Český Sportovní Klub)
1945–1948: SK Vítkovické Železárny
1948–1952: Sokol Vítkovické Železárny
1952–1957: Baník Vítkovice
1957–1976: VŽKG Ostrava
1976–1993: TJ Vítkovice
1993–2005: HC Vítkovice
2005–2016: HC Vítkovice Steel
2016–present: HC Vítkovice Ridera

See also
 :Category:HC Vítkovice Steel players for a list of HC Vítkovice players past and present.

References

External links

 Official website 

Vitkovice
Vitkovice
Sport in Ostrava
Ice hockey clubs established in 1928
1928 establishments in Czechoslovakia